{{Automatic taxobox
|image = honeysuckle_w_y.jpg
|image_caption = Lonicera japonica
|taxon = Caprifoliaceae
|authority = Juss.
|subdivision_ranks = Genera
|subdivision = See text
|type_genus =Lonicera 
|synonyms_ref = <ref name="Powo">{{cite web |title=Caprifoliaceae Juss.  Plants of the World Online  Kew Science |url=https://powo.science.kew.org/taxon/urn:lsid:ipni.org:names:30000739-2 |website=Plants of the World Online |access-date=19 August 2022 |language=en}}</ref>
|synonyms = Dipsacaceae Valerianaceae 
}}

The Caprifoliaceae or honeysuckle family is a clade of dicotyledonous flowering plants consisting of about 860 species, in 33, to 42 genera, with a nearly cosmopolitan distribution. Centres of diversity are found in eastern North America and eastern Asia, while they are absent in tropical and southern Africa.

Description
The flowering plants in this clade are mostly shrubs and vines: rarely herbs. They include some ornamental garden plants grown in temperate regions. The leaves are mostly opposite with no stipules (appendages at the base of a leafstalk or petiole), and may be either evergreen or deciduous. The flowers are tubular funnel-shaped or bell-like, usually with five outward spreading lobes or points, and are often fragrant. They usually form a small calyx with small bracts. The fruit is in most cases a berry or a drupe. The genera Diervilla and Weigela have capsular fruit, while Heptacodium has an achene.

Taxonomy
Views of the family-level classification of the traditionally accepted Caprifoliaceae and other plants in the botanical order Dipsacales have been considerably revised in recent decades.  Most botanists now accept the placement of two of the most familiar members of this group, the elderberries (Sambucus) and the viburnums (Viburnum), in the family Adoxaceae instead; these were formerly classified here.

Several other families of the more broadly treated Caprifoliaceae s.l. are separated by some but not all authors; these are treated as subfamilies in the listing of selected genera below, along with estimated numbers of species.

DiervilloideaeDiervilla (bush honeysuckle): 3 speciesWeigela: 10 species.
Caprifolioideae s.s.Heptacodium (seven-son flower): 1 speciesLeycesteria: 6 speciesLonicera (honeysuckle): 180 speciesSymphoricarpos (snowberry): 17 speciesTriosteum (horsegentian): 6 species
LinnaeoideaeAbelia: 30 speciesDipelta: 4 speciesKolkwitzia (beautybush): 1 speciesLinnaea (twinflower): 1 species
MorinoideaeAcanthocalyx: 3 species  Cryptothladia MorinaZabeliaDipsacoideaeBassecoiaCephalariaDipsacus  (teasel): 15 speciesKnautiaLomelosia: 63 species Pterocephalus: 25 speciesScabiosa (scabious, pincushion flower): 30 speciesSuccisaSuccisellaTriplostegia 
ValerianoideaeCentranthus: 12 speciesFediaNardostachys : 3 speciesPatrinia: 17 speciesPlectritis (seablushes): 5 speciesValeriana (valerians): 125 speciesValerianella (cornsalads): 20 species

Uses
The plants belonging to this family are mainly hardy shrubs or vines of ornamental value, many of which are popular garden shrubs, notably species belonging to the genera Abelia, Lonicera, and Weigela. Valerianella locusta is cultivated for use in food.

A few, however, have become invasive weeds outside their native ranges (such as Lonicera japonica'').

References

Other sources
Flowering Plants of the World, 1987, Vernon H. Heywood,  Andromeda Oxford Ltd., 
Botanica,  Gordon Cheers, Random House Australia,

External links

Caprifoliaceae in Topwalks
Species account : Caprifoliaceae
Comparison Table for the Cornidae

 
Asterid families